Hong Kong Post is a Japanese-language weekly newspaper published in Hong Kong every Friday and owned by Mikuni Company. The newspaper first appeared in June 1987. It used to be sold  in shops such as Citysuper, but is now free. It was formerly published by Pasona Press (HK) Co., Ltd.

Financial, economic, and political topics are stressed by this publication, and people working in business fields are the main clientele of the publication. Harumi Befu and Sylvie Guichard-Anguis, authors of Globalizing Japan: Ethnography of the Japanese presence in Asia, Europe, and America, described the paper as "A Major source of information for Hong Kong's Japanese residents".

History

The newspaper reported on anti-Japanese protests in 1996, including those targeting the Hong Kong Japanese School. Due to the protests being a reaction against past Japanese military actions, the newspaper's reporting lacked anger and shock towards the protests. Befu and Guichard-Anguis stated that the newspaper implied that "the past is irrelevant to the present" even though it never explicitly denied historical Japanese atrocities in Asia in any article.

Mikuni Company Limited (三國有限公司) was the publisher. In November 2018 the publishing was suspended. In 2019 Hirose Trading HK Limited (港通旭實業有限公司) became the publisher, and publication resumed.

Composition
The initial page discusses the economy of politics of Hong Kong. The subsequent page discusses news in Hong Kong and the southern portions of China. Columns related to business in Hong Kong and the China region follow. The final pages have cultural and non-business topics.

Corporate affairs
The head office of the publisher is in the Shui On Centre in Wan Chai.

The newspaper's head office was previously in the CCT Telecom Building in Fo Tan, Shatin. The newspaper's head office was previously in Leighton Centre in Causeway Bay.

See also
 Japanese people in Hong Kong
 Hong Kong Japanese School

References
  - Profile (PhD thesis) - PDF link - Available at ProQuest (preview for unregistered users)

Notes

External links
Hong Kong Post website 
 

Japanese-language newspapers
Newspapers published in Hong Kong
Newspapers established in 1987
1987 establishments in Hong Kong